The 14th Annual Interactive Achievement Awards is the 14th edition of the Interactive Achievement Awards, an annual awards event that honors the best games in the video game industry. It was also held as part of the academy's 2011 D.I.C.E. Summit, and was hosted by stand-up comedian Jay Mohr.

Mass Effect 2 won Game of the Year, while Red Dead Redemption received the most nominations and won the most awards. Electronic Arts, Rockstar San Diego, and Sony Computer Entertainment were tied with winning the most awards, with Sony receiving the most nominations.

BioWare co-founders Ray Muzyka & Greg Zeschuk, both received the of the Academy of Interactive Arts & Sciences Hall of Fame Award. Bing Gordon, former Chief Creative Officer of Electronic Arts received the Lifetime Achievement Award. Bill Budge, a game designer for the Apple II, received of the Pioneer Award.

Winners and Nominees
Winners are listed first, highlighted in boldface, and indicated with a double dagger.

Special Awards

Hall of Fame
 Ray Muzyka
 Greg Zeschuk

Lifetime Achievement
 Bing Gordon

Pioneer
 Bill Budge

Games with multiple nominations and awards

The following 23 games received multiple nominations:

The following five games received multiple awards:

Companies with multiple nominations

Companies that received multiple nominations as either a developer or a publisher.

Companies that received multiple awards as either a developer or a publisher.

External links

References

2011 awards
2011 awards in the United States
February 2011 events in the United States
2010 in video gaming
D.I.C.E. Award ceremonies